Utena District Municipality is one of 60 municipalities in Lithuania.

Structure 
District structure:   
 1 city – Utena;
 8 towns – Daugailiai, Kuktiškės, Leliūnai, Saldutiškis, Sudeikiai, Tauragnai, Užpaliai and Vyžuonos;
 592 villages.
  
Population of largest Molėtai District Municipality elderships (2001):
 Utena – 33860
 Užpaliai – 877
 Tauragnai – 602
 Vyžuonos – 581
 Antalgė – 564
 Kuktiškės – 485
 Leliūnai – 483
 Sudeikiai – 407
 Atkočiškės – 393
 Saldutiškis – 389.

Nature and geography

References

 
Municipalities of Utena County
Municipalities of Lithuania